Elena Michailovna  Shimko (born 22 April 1982) is a retired Russian badminton player.

Shimko won six junior titles and bronze at the 2001 European Junior Championships in Russia. In 2004 she became the Russian National Champion with her partner Marina Yakusheva. Outside her home country, she was successful at the Slovenian International, Slovak International, Belgian International and the Scottish Open, among others.

Achievements

European Junior Championships 
Girls' doubles

IBF/BWF International 
Women's singles

Women's doubles

Mixed doubles

References 

http://www.russkikh.com/news/2007/12_2007.htm
http://badminton.ru/arj_news.htm

1982 births
Living people
 Russian female badminton players
21st-century Russian women